Straight Plan for the Gay Man is an American comedy television series that premiered on February 23, 2004, on Comedy Central. It is a parody of Bravo's hit Queer Eye for the Straight Guy. Four straight comedians (the "Flab Four") – Curtis Gwinn (environment guy), Billy Merritt (appearance guy), Kyle Grooms (information guy), and Rob Riggle (culture guy) – make over three gay men to pass as straight. The show only ran for three episodes.  Music composed by Bob Golden.

The makeovers include lessons in poor manners, spartan home decorating, unfashionable wardrobes, and an overdeveloped ego to mask all personal failings. Episodes involved making over a fashion salesman into a meat-packer, a yoga instructor into a jock, and an entertainer into a suave "babe-magnet".

Reception

The show was panned by critics.

See also
LGBT stereotypes
Straight-acting

References

External links

2000s American LGBT-related comedy television series
2004 American television series debuts
2004 American television series endings
2000s American reality television series
Comedy Central original programming
Fashion-themed television series
Gay-related television shows
Home renovation television series
Reality television series parodies
Stereotypes of LGBT people